19th FFCC Awards
December 19, 2014

Best Picture:
Birdman

The 19th Florida Film Critics Circle Awards were given on December 19, 2014. The nominations were announced on December 16, 2014.

Winners

Best Picture
Birdman
 Runner-up: Boyhood
 The Grand Budapest Hotel

Best Director
Richard Linklater – Boyhood
 Runner-up: Alejandro G. Iñárritu – Birdman
 Wes Anderson – The Grand Budapest Hotel

Best Actor
Michael Keaton – Birdman
 Runner-up: Jake Gyllenhaal – Nightcrawler
 Eddie Redmayne – The Theory of Everything

Best Actress
Rosamund Pike – Gone Girl
 Runner-up: Julianne Moore – Still Alice
 Reese Witherspoon – Wild

Best Supporting Actor
J. K. Simmons – Whiplash
 Runner-up: Edward Norton – Birdman
 Mark Ruffalo – Foxcatcher

Best Supporting Actress
Patricia Arquette – Boyhood
 Runner-up: Emma Stone – Birdman
 Jessica Chastain – A Most Violent Year

Best Original Screenplay
The Grand Budapest Hotel – Wes Anderson and Hugo Guinness Runner-up: Birdman – Alejandro G. Iñárritu, Nicolás Giacobone, Alexander Dinelaris Jr., and Armando Bó
 Boyhood – Richard Linklater

Best Adapted ScreenplayGone Girl – Gillian Flynn Runner-up: Inherent Vice – Paul Thomas Anderson
 The Theory of Everything – Anthony McCarten

Best Animated FeatureThe Lego Movie
 Runner-up: How to Train Your Dragon 2
 Big Hero 6

Best Documentary
Life Itself
 Runner-up: Citizenfour
 Jodorowsky's Dune

Best Foreign Language Film
The Raid 2 • Indonesia Runner-up: Force Majeure • Sweden
 Ida • Poland

Best EnsembleThe Grand Budapest Hotel
 Runner-up: Boyhood
 Birdman

Best Art Direction / Production Design
The Grand Budapest Hotel – Adam Stockhausen and Anna Pinnock Runner-up: Interstellar – Nathan Crowley and Gary Fettis
 Into the Woods – Dennis Gassner and Anna Pinnock

Best CinematographyInterstellar – Hoyte van Hoytema Runner-up: The Grand Budapest Hotel – Robert Yeoman
 Birdman – Emmanuel Lubezki

Best ScoreUnder the Skin – Mica Levi Runner-up: Gone Girl – Trent Reznor and Atticus Ross
 Interstellar – Hans Zimmer

Best Visual EffectsInterstellar
 Runner-up: Guardians of the Galaxy
 Dawn of the Planet of the Apes

Pauline Kael Breakout Award
Damien Chazelle – Whiplash
 Runner-up: Gugu Mbatha-Raw – Belle / Beyond the Lights
 Jennifer Kent – The Babadook

Golden Orange
Borscht Corporation for their tireless championing of independent filmmaking.

References

External links
 

2014 film awards
2010s